Ferenc Uhereczky (20 January 1898 – 1967) was a Hungarian cyclist. He competed in two events at the 1924 Summer Olympics. During the 1910s and 1920s, Uhereczky won the Hungarian national title seven times.

References

External links
 

1898 births
1967 deaths
Hungarian male cyclists
Olympic cyclists of Hungary
Cyclists at the 1924 Summer Olympics